Atlanta High School is a public high school located in Atlanta, Texas, US. It is classified as a 3A school by the University Interscholastic League (UIL). It is part of the Atlanta Independent School District located in northeast Cass County which shares a border with the Queen City Independent School District. In 2015, the school was rated "Met Standard" by the Texas Education Agency.

Athletics
The Atlanta Rabbits compete in the following sports:

Baseball
Basketball
Cross Country
Football
Golf
Powerlifting
Soccer
Softball
Tennis
Track and Field
Volleyball

State Titles
Atlanta (UIL)
Baseball - 
1998(3A)
Football - 
2003(3A)
Boys Track - 
1989(3A), 1997(3A), 2002(3A), 2003(3A), 2004(3A), 2017 (4A)

State Finalists
Atlanta (UIL)
Football - 
1994(3A)

Atlanta Pruitt (PVIL)
Basketball - 
1951(PVIL-1A)

Band
Atlanta High School proudly showcases the 'Big Bad Band from Rabbitland'. The band most recently placed 14th at the 2006 3A State Marching Contest, 5th at the 2008 3A Texas State Marching Contest, 8th at the 2010 3A Texas State Marching Contest, 8th at the 2012 3A Texas State Marching Contest, 7th at the 2014 4A Texas State Marching Contest and 10th at the 2016 State Marching Contest. The band has made around 10 total appearances at the UIL Texas State Marching Contest dating back to the early 1980s. The band boasts a membership of 160 students grades 9-12 and over 425 students in grades 6-12.

Notable alumni

 Derrick Blaylock – professional football player (2002–2006)
 Ellen DeGeneres (1976), comedienne and actress
 Phil Epps – professional football player (1982–1989)
 Rickey Hatley – professional football player (2017)
 Randy Jackson – professional football player (1972–1974)
 Joseph Strickland (1977) – Bishop of the Roman Catholic Diocese of Tyler (2012–)
 Drew Stubbs – professional baseball player (2009–2017)
 Ted Thompson – professional football player (1975–1984)

References

External links
 
 Atlanta Independent School District

Public high schools in Texas
Schools in Cass County, Texas